Church of Our Lady of the Rosary of Black Men' may refer to:

Church of Our Lady of the Rosary of Black Men (Pirenópolis), Brazil
Church of Our Lady of the Rosary of Black Men (Sabará), Brazil
Church of Our Lady of the Rosary of Black Men (São Cristóvão), Brazil